William James Uglow Woolcock   (1878 – 13 November 1947) was a Liberal Party politician in England.

During the First World War, he was Assistant Director of Army Contracts, followed by Chairman of Medical Stores Committee for the War Office. He was appointed an Officer of the Order of the British Empire in the 1918 New Year Honours and a Commander of the Order in the 1920 New Year Honours.

At the 1918 general election, he was elected unopposed as Coalition Liberal Member of Parliament (MP) for Hackney Central. He stood down at the 1922 general election, and did not stand for Parliament again.

He later served as  Chairman of the Committee of Non-official Advisers associated with the Industrial Advisers of the United Kingdom Delegation at the Ottawa Conference. He was appointed a Companion of the Order of St Michael and St George in the 1933 New Year Honours.

References

Sources

External links 
 

1878 births
1947 deaths
Liberal Party (UK) MPs for English constituencies
UK MPs 1918–1922
Hackney Members of Parliament
Commanders of the Order of the British Empire
Companions of the Order of St Michael and St George